The 1895 Oregon Webfoots football team was an American football team that represented the University of Oregon in the 1895 college football season. It was the Webfoots' second season. They were led by head coach Percy Benson, previously a star player for the University of California team.

The Webfoots were part of a five-team conference called the Oregon Intercollegiate Football Association, which met in Salem on October 5, 1895, to elect officers, establish official rules, and set a schedule for the year. Other members of the conference included Oregon Agricultural College in Corvallis, Portland University (a short-lived private school which closed in 1900), Pacific University in Forest Grove, and Willamette University in Salem.

The first two games of the 1895 season — against OAC and Willamette — were regarded as exhibition practice games, the final two contests being official conference games that were part of the "league series."

They finished the season with a record of four wins and zero losses (4–0), winning the OIFA's pennant.

Schedule

Roster
Starters
 • Left end: Coleman
 • Left tackle: F. Templeton
 • Left guard: Edmunson
 • Center: Gilleland
 • Right guard: E. P. Shattuck
 • Right tackle: Herbold
 • Right end: Travis
 • Quarterback: R. Bryson
 • Left halfback: Bishop
 • Right halfback: Keene
 • Fullback: H. Templeton

Reserves: Farrington, A. Kuykendall, Merriman, Miller, Prather, Stransley; Higgins, Storossli

References

Oregon
Oregon Ducks football seasons
College football undefeated seasons
Oregon Webfoots football